The Lower Souris National Wildlife Refuge Airplane Hangar is an airplane hangar at the J. Clark Salyer National Wildlife Refuge near Upham, North Dakota.  It is a prefabricated, T-shaped, rounded arch metal structure that was built in 1947 by Butler Manufacturing Company.  It served as the home base for an airplane that was used to manage lands set aside for wildlife conservation in North Dakota and surrounding areas.  The hangar was listed on the National Register of Historic Places in 2011.

See also
Upper Souris National Wildlife Refuge

References

Government buildings on the National Register of Historic Places in North Dakota
Government buildings completed in 1947
Aircraft hangars on the National Register of Historic Places
National Register of Historic Places in McHenry County, North Dakota
1947 establishments in North Dakota
Aviation in North Dakota
Transportation in McHenry County, North Dakota